The SIPA S.90 was a French-built two-seat light touring and training aircraft of the 1940s and 1950s.

Design
The SIPA S.90 was designed by Yves Gardan for the Société Industrielle Pour l’Aéronautique (SIPA). The prototype first flew on 15 May 1947, winning a French government competition for a new light two-seat aircraft for operation by the French aero clubs.

The initial production S.90 was a low-wing aircraft with fixed tailwheel undercarriage and side-by-side seating for two. It was powered by a  Mathis G4F engine. Four examples were built.

Production and service
100 aircraft were ordered by the French government, on behalf of the aeroclubs, and these were powered by the  Minie 4DC engine as the SIPA S.901. The first made its initial flight on 25 June 1948. Deliveries were completed in the early 1950s. Various engines were later installed in the S.901, giving rise to new model numbers.

In later years, the S.90 series readily found buyers in the secondhand market and examples have flown with private owners in Belgium, Germany, Switzerland and the United Kingdom. Nine further aircraft were built later with plywood covering in lieu of fabric, receiving new designations. In 2001, 15 examples remained airworthy in France, Switzerland and the UK.

Total production of all models was 113 aircraft.

Variants

 
The following variants were produced:
S.90
4 aircraft with  Mathis G4F engine
S.901
100 aircraft with  Minié 4.DC.32  engine. Most were re-engined as follows.
S.902
S.901 with  Continental C85-12F engine
S.903
S.901 with  Continental C90-14F engine
S.904
S.901 with  Salmson 5AQ-01 engine
S.91
2 new aircraft as S.902 but with plywood-covered fuselage and wings
S.92
1 new aircraft as S.91 with  Mathis 4GB-62 engine
S.93
1 new aircraft as S.91 with  Salmson 5AQ-01 engine
S.94
5 new aircraft as S.91 with  Continental C90-8F engine

Specifications (SIPA S.902)

References

Notes

Bibliography

S0090
Single-engined tractor aircraft
Low-wing aircraft
1940s French sport aircraft
Aircraft first flown in 1947